Colin Dunlop (born 3 August 1962 in United Kingdom) is a Fijian sailor who represented his country at the 1988 Summer Olympics in Busan, South Korea as crew member in the Soling. With helmsman David Ashby and fellow crew member Colin Philp, Sr., they finished in 19th place. At the 1992 Summer Olympics in Barcelona, Spain Colin Philp, Sr. took the helm and with fellow crew member David Philp the team took 23rd place.

References

External links

Living people
1936 births
English emigrants to Fiji
Fijian male sailors (sport)
Fijian people of English descent
Olympic sailors of Fiji
People from Aldeburgh
Sailors at the 1988 Summer Olympics – Soling
Sailors at the 1992 Summer Olympics – Soling